Spirocerca is a genus of nematodes belonging to the family Spirocercidae.

The genus has cosmopolitan distribution.

Species:

Spirocerca arctica 
Spirocerca lupi

References

Nematodes